Buğdaylı can refer to:

 Buğdaylı, Bayburt
 Buğdaylı, Erzincan
 Buğdaylı, Köprüköy